This is the list of awards and nominations received by the American television series Weeds (2005–2012).

By Awards

Casting Society of America (CSA)
2007: Outstanding Casting - Comedy Series (nominated)
2009: Outstanding Casting - Comedy Series (nominated)

Emmy Awards
2006: Outstanding Casting - Comedy Series (nominated)
2006: Outstanding Directing - Comedy Series (Craig Zisk for "Good S*** Lollipop", nominated)
2006: Outstanding Main Title Design (nominated)
2006: Outstanding Picture Editing - Single-Camera Comedy Series (for "Good S*** Lollipop", nominated)
2006: Outstanding Supporting Actress - Comedy Series (Elizabeth Perkins for playing "Celia Hodes", nominated)
2007: Outstanding Actress - Comedy Series (Mary-Louise Parker for playing "Nancy Botwin", nominated)
2007: Outstanding Casting - Comedy Series (nominated)
2007: Outstanding Picture Editing - Single-Camera Comedy Series (for "Mrs. Botwin's Neighborhood", nominated)
2007: Outstanding Picture Editing - Single-Camera Comedy Series (for "Crush Girl Love Panic", nominated)
2007: Outstanding Supporting Actress - Comedy Series (Perkins, nominated)
2008: Outstanding Actress - Comedy Series (Parker, nominated)
2008: Outstanding Picture Editing - Comedy Series (Single or Multi-Camera (for "A Pool and His Money", nominated)
2008: Outstanding Sound Mixing - Comedy or Drama Series (Half-Hour) and Animation (for "Go", nominated)
2009: Outstanding Comedy Series (nominated)
2009: Outstanding Actress - Comedy Series (Mary-Louise Parker for playing "Nancy Botwin", nominated)
2009: Outstanding Supporting Actress - Comedy Series (Elizabeth Perkins for playing "Celia Hodes", nominated)
2009: Outstanding Casting - Comedy Series (nominated)
2009: Outstanding Cinematography For a Half Hour Series (for "Three Coolers", nominated)
2009: Outstanding Sound Mixing - Comedy or Drama Series (Half-Hour) and Animation (for "No Man is Pudding", won)
2010: Outstanding Cinematography for a Half-Hour Series	Michael Trim, won)

Golden Globe Awards
2005: Best Actress - Musical or Comedy Series (Mary-Louise Parker for playing "Nancy Botwin", won)
2005: Best Series - Musical or Comedy (nominated)
2005: Best Supporting Actress - Series, Miniseries or TV Film (Elizabeth Perkins for playing "Celia Hodes", nominated)
2006: Best Actress - Musical or Comedy Series (Parker, nominated)
2006: Best Series - Musical or Comedy (nominated)
2006: Best Supporting Actor - Series, Miniseries or TV Film (Justin Kirk for playing "Andy Botwin", nominated)
2006: Best Supporting Actress - Series, Miniseries or TV Film (Perkins, nominated)
2007: Best Actress - Musical or Comedy Series (Parker, nominated)
2008: Best Actress - Musical or Comedy Series (Parker, nominated)
2008: Best Series - Musical or Comedy (nominated)

Image Awards
2006: Outstanding Supporting Actor - Comedy Series (Romany Malco for playing "Conrad Shepard", nominated)
2007: Outstanding Supporting Actor - Comedy Series (Malco, nominated)
2007: Outstanding Supporting Actress - Comedy Series (Tonye Patano for playing "Heylia James", nominated)

Producers Guild of America (PGA)
2006: Television Producer of the Year - Episodic Comedy (nominated)

Satellite Awards
2005: Best Actress - Musical or Comedy Series (Mary-Louise Parker for playing "Nancy Botwin", won)
2005: Best Actress - Musical or Comedy Series (Elizabeth Perkins for playing "Celia Hodes", nominated)
2006: Best Actress - Musical or Comedy Series (Parker, nominated)
2006: Best Supporting Actress - Series, Miniseries or TV Film (Perkins, nominated)
2007: Best Series - Musical or Comedy (nominated)
2007: Best Supporting Actor - Series, Miniseries or TV Film (Justin Kirk for playing "Andy Botwin", nominated)

Screen Actors Guild (SAG)
2005: Outstanding Actress - Comedy Series (Mary-Louise Parker for playing "Nancy Botwin", nominated)
2006: Outstanding Actress - Comedy Series (Parker, nominated)
2006: Outstanding Cast - Comedy Series (nominated)
2007: Outstanding Actress - Comedy Series (Parker, nominated)
2008: Outstanding Actress - Comedy Series (Parker, nominated)
2008: Outstanding Cast - Comedy Series (nominated)

Saturn Awards
2011: Best Guest Performance in a Television Series (Richard Dreyfuss for playing "Warren Schif", won)

Writers Guild of America (WGA)
2005: Best Writing - Episodic Comedy (Jenji Kohan for "You Can't Miss the Bear (Pilot)", won)

Young Artist Awards
2006: Best Supporting Young Actor - Television Series (Alexander Gould for playing "Shane Botwin", won)
2007: Best Supporting Young Actor - Television Series (Gould, nominated)

By year

2005
Golden Globe Awards: Best Actress - Musical or Comedy Series (Mary-Louise Parker, won)
Golden Globe Awards: Best Series - Musical or Comedy (nominated)
Golden Globe Awards: Best Supporting Actress - Series, Miniseries or TV Film (Elizabeth Perkins, nominated)
Satellite Awards: Best Actress - Musical or Comedy Series (Parker, won)
Satellite Awards: Best Actress - Musical or Comedy Series (Perkins, nominated)
Screen Actors Guild: Outstanding Actress - Comedy Series (Parker, nominated)
Writers Guild of America: Best Writing - Episodic Comedy (Jenji Kohan, won)

2006
Emmy Awards: Outstanding Casting - Comedy Series (nominated)
Emmy Awards: Outstanding Directing - Comedy Series (Craig Zisk for "Good S*** Lollipop", nominated)
Emmy Awards: Outstanding Main Title Design (nominated)
Emmy Awards: Outstanding Picture Editing - Single-Camera Comedy Series (for "Good S*** Lollipop", nominated)
Emmy Awards: Outstanding Supporting Actress - Comedy Series (Elizabeth Perkins for playing "Celia Hodes", nominated)
Golden Globe Awards: Best Actress - Musical or Comedy Series (Mary-Louise Parker, nominated)
Golden Globe Awards: Best Series - Musical or Comedy (nominated)
Golden Globe Awards: Best Supporting Actor - Series, Miniseries or TV Film (Justin Kirk for playing "Andy Botwin", nominated)
Golden Globe Awards: Best Supporting Actress - Series, Miniseries or TV Film (Perkins, nominated)
Image Awards: Outstanding Supporting Actor - Comedy Series (Romany Malco for playing "Conrad Shepard", nominated)
Producers Guild of America: Television Producer of the Year - Episodic Comedy (nominated)
Satellite Awards: Best Actress - Musical or Comedy Series (Parker, nominated)
Satellite Awards: Best Supporting Actress - Series, Miniseries or TV Film (Perkins, nominated)
Screen Actors Guild: Outstanding Actress - Comedy Series (Parker, nominated)
Screen Actors Guild: Outstanding Cast - Comedy Series (nominated)
Young Artist Awards: Best Supporting Young Actor - Television Series (Alexander Gould, won)

2007
Casting Society of America: Outstanding Casting - Comedy Series (nominated)
Emmy Awards: Outstanding Actress - Comedy Series (Mary-Louise Parker, nominated)
Emmy Awards: Outstanding Casting - Comedy Series (nominated)
Emmy Awards: Outstanding Picture Editing - Single-Camera Comedy Series (for "Mrs. Botwin's Neighborhood", nominated)
Emmy Awards: Outstanding Picture Editing - Single-Camera Comedy Series (for "Crush Girl Love Panic", nominated)
Emmy Awards: Outstanding Supporting Actress - Comedy Series (Elizabeth Perkins, nominated)
Golden Globe Awards: Best Actress - Musical or Comedy Series (Parker, nominated)
Image Awards: Outstanding Supporting Actor - Comedy Series (Romany Malco, nominated)
Image Awards: Outstanding Supporting Actress - Comedy Series (Tonye Patano for playing "Heylia James", nominated)
Satellite Awards: Best Series - Musical or Comedy (nominated)
Satellite Awards: Best Supporting Actor - Series, Miniseries or TV Film (Justin Kirk for playing "Andy Botwin", nominated)
Screen Actors Guild: Outstanding Actress - Comedy Series (Parker, nominated)
Young Artist Awards: Best Supporting Young Actor - Television Series (Alexander Gould, nominated)

2008
Emmy Awards: Outstanding Actress - Comedy Series (Mary-Louise Parker, nominated)
Emmy Awards: Outstanding Picture Editing - Comedy Series (Single or Multi-Camera (for "A Pool and His Money", nominated)
Emmy Awards: Outstanding Sound Mixing - Comedy or Drama Series (Half-Hour) and Animation (for "Go", nominated)
Golden Globe Awards: Best Actress - Musical or Comedy Series (Parker, nominated)
Golden Globe Awards: Best Series - Musical or Comedy (nominated)

2009
Emmy Awards: Outstanding Comedy Series (nominated)
 Outstanding Actress - Comedy Series (Mary-Louise Parker for playing "Nancy Botwin", nominated)
 Outstanding Supporting Actress - Comedy Series (Elizabeth Perkins for playing "Celia Hodes", nominated)
 Outstanding Casting - Comedy Series (nominated)
 Outstanding Cinematography For a Half Hour Series (for "Three Coolers", nominated)
 Outstanding Sound Mixing - Comedy or Drama Series (Half-Hour) and Animation (for "No Man is Pudding", won)
 Casting Society of America: Outstanding Casting - Comedy Series (nominated)
 Screen Actors Guild: Outstanding Actress - Comedy Series (Parker, nominated)
 Outstanding Cast - Comedy Series (nominated)

2010
Emmy Awards: Outstanding Cinematography for a Half-Hour Series Michael Trim, (won)

Weeds
Weeds (TV series)